Y Lliwedd is a mountain, connected to Snowdon in the Snowdonia National Park, North Wales.

The eastern flanks are steep cliffs rising above Glaslyn and Llyn Llydaw. Y Lliwedd is the most conspicuous of the peaks for those who approach Snowdon via the Miners' and Pyg tracks. Few that summit Snowdon continue over to Y Lliwedd as the challenge of Wales' highest peak is enough, leaving Y Lliwedd quiet and peaceful even when queues are forming at the summit of Snowdon.

Hikers and mountaineers often pass over Y Lliwedd when walking the Snowdon Horseshoe. The noted British climber George Mallory undertook many of his early climbs here. It was also the site of considerable training activity for the 1953 British Everest Expedition.

The north face of Y Lliwedd was explored in the late 19th century and in 1909 was the subject of the first British climbing guide, The Climbs on Lliwedd by J. M. A. Thomson and A. W. Andrews.

Two subsidiary peaks of Y Lliwedd are listed as Nuttalls: Lliwedd Bach :  and Y Lliwedd East Peak : .

References

Gallery

External links
 www.geograph.co.uk : photos of Y Lliwedd and surrounding area

Beddgelert
Mountains and hills of Gwynedd
Mountains and hills of Snowdonia
Hewitts of Wales
Marilyns of Wales
Nuttalls